Eulitoma is a genus of sea snails, marine gastropod mollusks in the family Eulimidae.

Species
Species within this genus include the following:
 Eulitoma akauni (Habe, 1952)
 Eulitoma arcus (Bouchet & Warén, 1986)
 Eulitoma insignis (Dautzenberg & Fischer H.,1896)
 Eulitoma josephinae (Bouchet & Warén, 1986)
 Eulitoma langfordi (Dall, 1925)
 Eulitoma nishimurai (Habe, 1958)
 Eulitoma nitens (Laseron, 1955)
 Eulitoma obtusiuscula (Bouchet & Warén, 1986)

Species brought into synonymy
 Eulitoma arca (Bouchet & Warén, 1986):synonym of Eulitoma arcus (Bouchet & Warén, 1986)
 Eulitoma castanea (Laseron, 1955): synonym of  Fusceulima castanea (Laseron, 1955)

References

 Warén, A. (1984). A generic revision of the family Eulimidae (Gastropoda, Prosobranchia). Journal of Molluscan Studies. suppl 13: 1-96.

External links
 Laseron C. F. (1955). Revision of the New South Wales Eulimoid shells. Australian Zoologist 12 (2): 83-101

Eulimidae